Unhyeongung, also known as Unhyeongung Royal Residence, is a former Korean royal residence located at 114-10 Unni-dong, Jongno-gu, Seoul, Korea. It was formerly the residence of the Heungseon Daewongun a prince regent of Korea during the Joseon Dynasty in the 19th century, and father of Emperor Gojong. Gojong himself also lived in this residence until age 12 when he assumed the throne. It is currently a museum and is open to the public free of charge.

History

The site dates from the 14th century. Early buildings were damaged or destroyed during the Japanese invasions of Korea (1592–1598), but some of the early construction remains. Under the direction of Queen Mother Jo, Unhyeongung was converted into a grander complex with four gates.

Although the residential complex was taken from the Heungseon Daewongun's descendants under Japanese colonial rule, it was returned in 1948, and in 1993 they sold it to the Seoul government. It subsequently underwent three years of renovations to restore it to its earlier appearance.

Today's complex is smaller than its previous extent, as Duksung Women's University now occupies part of its grounds, as well as other smaller businesses including Unhyeon Kindergarten and Byeolhadang hanok guesthouse. The remaining complex includes:

Structures
Some of the interiors have been refurnished, and contain mannequins dressed in typical clothing styles for various stations of life in Korean history. The complex also contains a small museum.
The residence is open to the public，free of charge.

Norakdang Hall
Norakdang is the largest building within the complex and is the site of wedding of King Gojong and Empress Myeongseong.  Norakdang also was as one of the two residence buildings for women.

The most notable structure inside Norakdang is the kitchen, which was most likely used for food preparation when hosting important events. The hall held many important events such as birthday parties and related ceremonies.

A reenactment of a traditional wedding ceremony continues to be held at Norakdang.

Noandang Hall
Noandang was where the Heungseon Daewongun received his guests and also served as the leisure quarters for the men. The hall was not just a place of leisure and entertainment. The Heungseon Daewongun, as the father of a young Emperor, carried out all his business from Noandang.

Irodang Hall
Irodang is one of two woman's residences on the residence complex.

Sujiksa

Sujiksa is a small row of rooms to the right from the entrance. These rooms provided housing for the servants and guards.

Royal wedding ceremony

Unhyeongung is the site for the last Royal wedding ceremony, a reenactment of King Gojong and Empress Myeongseong's wedding that took place on the grounds of Unhyeongung on March 21, 1866.  This reenactment takes place in the spring and fall of every year.

This ceremony is an exact reenactment, based on thorough historical research and consultation by the palace’s counsel panel, of the regal and grandeur style of the imperial family's royal wedding ceremony. This reenactment offers visitors an opportunity to experience the spectacular and elegant traditional royal costumes and lifestyles of the Joseon dynasty.

Gallery

See also 
 Gyeongbokgung
 Culture of Korea

References

Bibliography

External links

 Official website 

Jongno District
Royal residences in South Korea
Palaces in South Korea
Tourist attractions in Seoul
Buildings and structures in Seoul